Utmankhel a Pashtun tribe present in Pakistan, with substantial numbers in Afghanistan. They lie between the Mohmands and the Ranizais of Swat, to the west and south-west of the junction of the Swat and Panjkora rivers. The Utmankhels mostly living in Malakand, Bajawar, Mohmand, Lower Dir, Mardan and Orakzai. The Utmankhel are Pashtuns, part of the Karlani tribal confederacy, who fought against British and Mughals emperors in Pakhtunkhwa.The British regarded the Utmankhel tribesmen as “warlike” peoples and one of the Martial Race.The Utmankhel are a tall, stout and fair race, but their dress and general customs have been assimilated by the neighbouring peoples of Bajuar. Utmankhels speak the same dialect of Pashtu called Peshawari/Northeastern Pashto.

Notable people

 Bahadar Khan -(Lower Dir)
 Gul Dad Khan-(Bajaur)
 Muzafar Said -(Lower Dir)
 Nisar Muhammad-(Malakand)
 Fida Mohammad Khan (politician)-(Malakand)
 Saeed Gul-(Lower Dir)
 Ajmal Khan (politician) -(Bajaur)
Inayatullah Khan (Pakistani politician)
Muhammad Khan Toor Utmankhel
Rahmat Shah Sail
 Muhammad Umar Khan "Swal Qilla Malak" -(Bajaur)
 Sajid Afghan, writer and poet from Lower Dir

See also 
 Utmankhel Subdivision
 Barang Subdivision
 Ambar Utmankhel
 Pran Ghar Tehsil
 Dara Utmankhel
 Gosam
 Agra (union council)
 Kharkai
 Kohi Barmol
 Mian Khan
 Sangao (Mardan District)
 Baizo Kharki

References

Sources

 A-H. McMahon and A.D.G. Ramsay Report on the Tribes of Dir, Swat and Bajour together with the Utmankhel and Sam Ranizai, reprint 1981, p. 27. Henceforth McMahon and Ramsay

External links
 
 http://www.antiquesatoz.com/stephenherold/nwfrontc.htm Expeditions Against the Tribes of the Northwest Frontier Province from 1847 to 1908
 Documents compiled by the Intelligence Department of the Government of British India, 1937 Who's Who Directory of Dir Swat and Chitral Agency
 https://trove.nla.gov.au/newspaper/article/11018225 CALCUTTA, Newspaper Feb. 27. 1935
 Zamung Mujahidin By Abdul Haleem Asar Afghani
 Gumnam Pakhtun Heroes by Farhad Ali Khawar

Karlani Pashtun tribes